The women's 100 metre freestyle competition of the 2018 FINA World Swimming Championships (25 m) was held on 12 and 13 December 2018.

Records
Prior to the competition, the existing world and championship records were as follows.

Results

Heats
The heats were started on 12 December at 10:03.

Semifinals
The semifinals were held on the 12th of December at 20:07.

Semifinal 1

Semifinal 2

Final
The final took place on the 13th of December at 19:09.

References

Women's 100 metre freestyle